Danielle McKenzie (born 4 August 1994) is a New Zealand ocean racing canoeist and competitive surf lifesaver. In September 2019, she won the gold medal at the ICF Canoe Ocean Racing World Championships on her debut.

References

External links
Profile at vaikobi.com

1994 births
Living people
Sportspeople from Auckland
New Zealand female canoeists
New Zealand surf lifesavers